The NXT Tag Team Championship is a men's professional wrestling tag team championship created and promoted by the American promotion WWE. It is defended on the NXT brand division, the promotion's developmental territory. Introduced on January 23, 2013, the inaugural championship team was British Ambition (Adrian Neville and Oliver Grey). The current champions are Gallus (Mark Coffey and Wolfgang), who are in their first reign. 

The title was established as the men's tag team championship for NXT, which at the time was a developmental territory for WWE. Over the years, NXT grew to become WWE's third major brand, which became official in September 2019 when the NXT television program was moved to the USA Network. Two years later, however, NXT reverted to its original function as WWE's developmental brand. In September 2022, the NXT UK Tag Team Championship was unified into the NXT Tag Team Championship.

History 

In June 2012, WWE established NXT as their developmental territory, replacing Florida Championship Wrestling (FCW). The following year on the January 23 episode of NXT, special guest and WWE Hall of Famer Shawn Michaels announced that there would be an eight-team single-elimination tournament to crown the first NXT Tag Team Champions. On the January 31 taping of NXT (aired February 13), British Ambition (Adrian Neville and Oliver Grey) defeated The Wyatt Family (Luke Harper and Erick Rowan) in the tournament final to become the inaugural champions. In the first title defense, however, Neville and Bo Dallas defended the title against The Wyatt Family due to Grey being injured, where they lost; Dallas was not recognized as champion. On the June 20 taping of NXT (aired July 17), Neville and Corey Graves defeated The Wyatt Family for the title, making Neville the first two-time champion. On June 8, 2016, The Revival (Scott Dawson and Dash Wilder) became the first team to hold the championship on more than one occasion when they defeated American Alpha (Chad Gable and Jason Jordan) at TakeOver: The End.

Although NXT had been established as WWE's developmental territory, over the years it grew to establish itself as WWE's third major brand. This would become official in September 2019 when NXT was moved to the USA Network, thus making the NXT Tag Team Championship the third major tag team title for men in WWE, along with the WWE Raw Tag Team Championship and WWE SmackDown Tag Team Championship. However, WWE revamped NXT in September 2021 and returned the brand to its original function as a developmental territory.

In August 2022, WWE announced that the NXT UK brand would go on hiatus and would relaunch as NXT Europe in 2023. As such, NXT UK's championship's were unified into their respective NXT championship counterparts. On September 4, 2022, at Worlds Collide, Pretty Deadly (Elton Prince and Kit Wilson) defeated Gallus (Mark Coffey and Wolfgang), reigning NXT Tag Team Champions The Creed Brothers (Brutus Creed and Julius Creed), and NXT UK Tag Team Champions Brooks Jensen and Josh Briggs in a fatal four-way tag team elimination match to unify the NXT UK Tag Team Championship into the NXT Tag Team Championship. Jensen and Briggs were recognized as the final NXT UK Tag Team Champions, while Pretty Deadly went forward as the unified NXT Tag Team Champions.

Inaugural tournament

Belt design

The original NXT Tag Team Championship belts featured a simple design. The center plate was an irregular polygon. Prominently down the center of the plate was a vertical NXT logo in gold; to the left center side of the logo read "Tag" while the right center side read "Team". The two side plates contained the WWE logo. The plates were on a black leather strap. A unique feature of this original design was that the two belts were slightly different. On one belt, the left side of the center plate was black with "Tag" written in gold while the right side of the center plate was gold with "Team" written in black; the other belt was the opposite. The side plates also reflected this coloring; the side plate on the black side was dominated by a black background behind the WWE logo while the side plate on the gold side had a dominant gold background behind the WWE logo. When first introduced, the side plates had the WWE scratch logo but in August 2014, all of WWE's pre-existing championships at the time received a minor update, changing the scratch logo to WWE's current logo that was originally used for the WWE Network.

On April 1, 2017, at WrestleMania Axxess, NXT General Manager William Regal announced that all of the NXT title belts would be redesigned. The new title belts were unveiled at TakeOver: Orlando that same night and given to the winners of their respective matches. Both the center plate and side plates of the new NXT Tag Team Championship belts are the same shape as the previous design and are again on black leather straps. The differences are the design on the plates themselves. The center plate maintains the vertical NXT logo prominently in the center, but now in silver with the WWE logo affixed at the very center of the "X". At the top of the plate right above the vertical NXT logo is a banner that reads "Tag Team", while at the bottom of the plate below the logo is a banner that reads "Champions". Black, silver, and gold ornamentation fills in the rest of the plate. Unlike the previous design, both belts are exactly the same. Coming in line with the majority of WWE's other championship belts, the updated design features side plates with a removable center section that can be customized with the champion's logo; the default side plates feature the WWE logo. As a result, the championship was the first WWE tag team championship to feature customizable side plates.

Reigns  

The Undisputed Era as a stable have the most reigns at three, while individually, stable member Kyle O'Reilly has the most reigns, also at three. The inaugural champions were the British Ambition (Adrian Neville and Oliver Grey). The team with the longest reign is The Ascension (Conor O'Brian/Konnor and Rick Victor/Viktor), who held the title for 364 days, while the shortest reign belongs to Moustache Mountain (Tyler Bate and Trent Seven), who held the title for 2 days. However, due to tape delays, which are the dates that WWE officially recognizes, they recognize that The Ascension's reign was 343 days and that Moustache Mountain's reign was 22 days, which are still the longest and shortest reigns regardless. Tyler Bate holds the record as the youngest champion when he won it at 21, while the oldest is Bobby Fish when he won it at 42.

The current champions are Gallus (Mark Coffey and Wolfgang), who are in their first reign, both as a team and individually. They defeated previous champions The New Day (Kofi Kingston and Xavier Woods), Pretty Deadly (Elton Prince and Kit Wilson), and Chase University (Andre Chase and Duke Hudson) in a fatal four-way tag team match at NXT Vengeance Day on February 4, 2023, in Charlotte, North Carolina.

See also
 Tag team championships in WWE

Notes

References

External links
Official NXT Tag Team Championship Title History

WWE NXT championships
Tag team wrestling championships